This is a list of notable people either born in, from or connected to Long Island.

List

Born on Long Island
 50 Cent (rapper, actor)
 Hoodie Allen (rapper)
 Donatella Arpaia (restaurateur and a television personality)
 Ashanti (Singer) (singer)
 Alec Baldwin (actor)
 Daniel Baldwin (actor)
 Stephen Baldwin (actor)
 William Baldwin (actor)
 Madison Beer (singer, model)
 Jon Bellion (singer/songwriter)
 Pat Benatar (singer)
 Tony Bennett (singer)
 Nikki Blonsky (actress)
 Brian Bloom (actor)
 Nicholas Braun
 Michael "Mikey" Brenley
 Jim Breuer (comedian)
 Brian Burns (actor)
 Edward Burns (actor, screenwriter)
 Ken Burns (filmmaker)
 Steve Buscemi (actor)
 Jennifer Capriati (tennis player)
 Mariah Carey (singer)
 Ryan Cassata (musician)
 Tricia Cast (actress)
 Frank Catalanotto (baseball player)
 Speedy Claxton (basketball player)
 LL Cool J (rapper)
 Kevin Connolly (actor)
 Kevin Conroy (actor)
 Bob Costas (sportscaster)
 Kevin Covais (singer, American Idol)
 Billy Crystal (actor)
 Anthony Cumia (podcaster, radio host)
 Chuck D (rapper)
 Rodney Dangerfield (comedian)
 Lama Surya Das (Buddhist teacher)
 Gary "Baba Booey" Dell'Abate (radio personality)
 Dave Dictor
 Donald "Buck Dharma" Roeser (guitarist)
 James Dolan (CEO)
 Billy Donovan (basketball coach)
 William "Flavor Flav" Drayton (rapper)
 Fran Drescher (actress)
 Meredith Eaton-Gilden
 Jumbo Elliot (football player)
 Julius Erving (basketball Player)
 Boomer Esiason (NFL quarterback) 
 Everlast (singer)
 Edie Falco (actress)
 Andrew Barth Feldman (actor)
 Jack Feldman (lyricist) 
 D'Brickashaw Ferguson (NFL player)
 Jay Fiedler (football player)
 Amy Fisher (former convicted attempted murderer)
 Flavor Flav (rapper)
 William Floyd (signer, Declaration of Independence)
 Melvin Fowler
 Adam Fox (NHL player) 
 Mike Francesa (sports radio commentator)
 Art Garfunkel (singer)
 Debbie Gibson (singer)
 Ilana Glazer (comedian, writer, actress)
 Tony Graffanino
 Bob Griffin (basketball player, English Literature professor)
 Leroy Grumman (engineer, co-founder Northrop-Grumman)
 Tom Gugliotta
 Aaron Hall and Damion Hall (R&B Singers of the group Guy) 
 Melissa Joan Hart (actress)
 Joey Heatherton
Frank Nappi (author) 
 Christopher Higgins (hockey player)
 Gregg "Opie" Hughes (radio host)
 Sarah Hughes (figure skater)
 Joe Iconis (composer/songwriter)
 Kevin James (actor, comedian)
 Christine Jorgensen
 Bob Keeshan
 Jackie Kennedy Onassis (former First Lady)
 Brian Kilmeade (Fox News personality)
 Mike Komisarek
 Tony Kornheiser (sports personality)
 Michael Kors
 Ron Kovic (activist, author)
 Saul Kripke
 Jonathan Larson
 Cyndi Lauper (singer)
 Lori Loughlin (actress)
 Charles Ludlam (playwright, theater producer)
 Patti LuPone (actress, singer)
 Ralph Macchio (actor)
 Liv Mammone (poet)
 Jackie Martling (former head writer for The Howard Stern Show)
 Lisa Matassa (singer)
Steven Matz (baseball player)
 Idina Menzel (actress, singer)
 Method Man (rapper)
 Charlie McAvoy (NHL defenseman)
 Kate McKinnon (comedian)
 "Stuttering" John Melendez (comedian)
 Harvey Milk (politician)
 Larry Miller (comedian, actor)
 John Moschitta, Jr. (FedEx TV commercial personality)
 Eddie Money (musician)
 Jane Monheit
 Brandon Moore
 Kevin Moore (keyboard player/ex-Dream Theater, Chroma Key, O.S.I.)
 Rob Moore (American football)
 Charlie Murphy (actor, comedian)
 Eddie Murphy (actor, comedian, musician)
 Michael Patrick Murphy (former Navy SEAL)
 John Myung (bassist, Dream Theater)
 Anthony Nese (pro wrestler)
 Eric Nystrom (hockey player)
 Soledad O'Brien (news anchor)
 Meredith O'Connor (singer)
 Rosie O'Donnell (comedian)
 Bill O'Reilly (commentator)
 Mike Petke (soccer player)
 John Petrucci (guitarist, Dream Theater)
 Mike Portnoy  (drummer, ex-Dream Theater)
 Prodigy (rapper)
 Steve Park (race car driver)
 Rosie Perez (actress)
 Thomas Pynchon (author)
 R.A. the Rugged Man
 Rakim (MC)
 Lou Reed (singer)
 Rev. Run (rapper)
 Kim Richards (actress)
 Ray Romano (comedian)
 Susan Sarandon (actress)
 Joe Satriani (guitarist)
 John Savage (actor)
 Telly Savalas (actor)
 Anthony Scaramucci (White House Communications Director and investment manager)
 Chuck Schuldiner
 Rob Scuderi
 Cletus Seldin (boxer)
 Eric Sermon
 Matt Serra
 Brian Setzer (guitarist)
 Kevin Shinick (writer, actor, director)
 Talia Shire (actress)
 Jamie-Lynn Sigler (actress)
 DJ Skribble (disc jockey)
 Helen Slater (actress)
 Dee Snider (singer)
 Eric Spoto (Power Lifter)
Marcus Stroman (baseball player)
 Martin Tankleff (falsely convicted of murdering parents in 1988, served 17 years in prison)
 John Tesh (TV and radio Personality)
 Vinny Testaverde (former NFL quarterback)
 Laurence Traiger (Composer)
 Thomas Truxtun
 Steve Vai (guitarist)
 Frank Viola
 Leslie West
 Walt Whitman (poet)
 John Williams (composer)
 Carl Yastrzemski (baseball player)
 Amos Zereoué (NFL player, retired)
 Zillakami (singer, rapper, songwriter)
 Richard Zimler (novelist)

Raised on Long Island (but not born on Long Island)
 Gustav Åhr (Lil Peep), (rapper)
 Lyle Alzado (professional American football player)
 Bruce Arena (soccer coach)
 Kenia Arias (singer) 
 Dave Attell (comedian)
 David Baltimore (biologist)
 Pat Benatar (singer)
 Ross Bleckner (artist)
 Paul Bowles (composer, author, and translator)
 Edith Ewing Bouvier Beale (socialite)
 Edith Bouvier Beale (socialite)
 Peter Breggin (psychiatrist)
 Jim Brown (former professional American football player and actor)
 Lorraine Bracco (actress)
 Edward Burns (actor)
 Elaine Chao (businesswoman and politician, Secretary of Labor from 2001 to 2009 and Secretary of Transportation from 2017 to 2021)
 Ben Cohen (businessman)
 Kenneth Cole (clothing designer)
 Margaret Colin (actress)
 Francis Ford Coppola (movie director)
 Al D'Amato (politician)
 Tony Danza (actor)
 Robert Davi (actor, singer, writer, and director)
 Ted Demme (director, producer, and actor)
 Michael Dempsey (Bassist)
 Brian Dennehy (actor)
 Howard Deutch (director)
 John DiResta (comedian, actor, and former New York City Transit Police officer)
 Elliot Easton (guitarist, The Cars)
 EPMD (rap group)
 Edie Falco (actress)
 Martin Feldstein (economist)
 Reggie Fils-Aime (businessman, former president of Nintendo of America)
 J. P. Foschi (former professional American football player)
 Susan Foster (jewelry designer)
 Bill Freiberger (television writer and producer)
 Kate French (actress and model)
 Barbara Gaines (TV producer)
 Rande Gerber (entertainment industry businessman)
 Louis Gerstner, Jr. (businessman, former chairman and executive officer of IBM)
 Lisa "Lisa G" Glasberg (radio personality)
 Louise Glück (poet, essayist,  and winner of the 2020 Nobel Prize in Literature)
 Doris Kearns Goodwin (historian)
 Jerry Greenfield (businessman)
 Morlon Greenwood (former professional American football player)
 William Griffin Jr. (Rakim) (rapper)
 Al Groh (American football analyst and former player and coach)
 Carolyn Gusoff (reporter)
 Steve Guttenberg (actor)
 LisaGay Hamilton (actress)
 Sean Hannity (Fox News commentator)
 Kemp Hannon (politician)
 Kene Holliday (actor)
 Emily Hughes (former figure skater)
 Glenn Hughes (singer)
 Billy Idol (singer)
 Michael Isikoff (investigative journalist)
 David Israel (television producer, writer, former sportswriter, and general columnist)
 Billy Joel (singer)
 Dean Kamen (engineer, inventor, and businessman)
 Donna Karan (fashion designer)
 Andy Kaufman (comedian)
 Brian Keith (actor)
 Moira Kelly (actress)
 George Kennedy (actor)
 Gene Larkin (former professional baseball player)
 Peggy Lipton (actress)
 Denise Lor (singer and actress)
 Cynthia Loving (Lil' Mo) (singer, songwriter, rapper, television and radio personality)
 Craig Mack (rapper and record producer)
 John Mackey (former professional American football player)
 Jeffrey MacDonald (convicted murderer)
 Steve Madden (designer)
 Biz Markie (Rapper)
 Ira Magaziner (political advisor)
 Melanie Martinez (singer)
 Ashley Massaro (professional wrestler, reality television contestant, television host, model, and radio personality)
 Michael McKean (actor)
 Idina Menzel (actress, singer, and songwriter)
 Adam, Ryan, and Jack Metzger (AJR) (pop trio and multi-instrumentalists)
 Bruce Murray (sportscaster)
 Keith Murray (rapper)
 Dan Nelson (singer)
 Shane Olivea (former professional American football player)
 Harry Park (pH-1) (rapper)
 Adam Pascal (actor, singer, and musician)
 Rick Pasqualone (actor)
 Chrisette Michele Payne (singer-songwriter)
 Robert Phillips (classical guitarist)
 Natalie Portman (actress)
 The Product G&B (R&B duo)
 Jef Raskin (human–computer interface expert, conceived and started the Macintosh project at Apple) 
 C.J. Ramone (bassist, The Ramones)
 Don Rickles (comedian)
 Evan Roberts (radio personality)
 Ray Romano (comedian)
 Seth Rudetsky (musician, actor, writer, and radio host)
 Zack Ryder (wrestler)
 Stephanie Saland (ballet dancer and teacher)
 Jack Scalia (actor)
 Laura Schlessinger (talk show host and author)
 John Sebastian (singer)
 Jerry Seinfeld (comedian)
 Tyler-Justin Sharpe (Lil Tecca) (rapper)
 Cindy Sherman (photographer, director)
 Richard Shindell (singer)
 Trevor Smith Jr. (Busta Rhymes) (rapper)
 Jim Steinman (composer, lyricist, record producer, and playwright)
 Susan Sullivan (actress)
 Wally Szczerbiak (former professional basketball player)
 Laurence Traiger (composer)
 Fred Travalena (comedian)
 Jenna Ushkowitz (Actress)
 Gary Valentine (actor, comedian)
 Stuart Weitzman (shoe designer)
 John Wilson (filmmaker)
 Alan Zweibel (producer)

Moved to Long Island as an adult (neither born nor raised on Long Island)
 Marco Arment (developer, podcaster)
 Eric Booker (YouTuber, competitive eater)
 Harry Chapin (musician, composer)
 John Coltrane (saxophonist)
 Perry Como (musician)
 Nelson DeMille
 Manuel De Peppe (actor, singer, composer, arranger, music producer)
 Francis Scott Fitzgerald (writer)
 John Ford (musician)
 Victoria Gotti (reality-show star)
 Sal Governale
 Joseph Heller (author)
 Otto Hermann Kahn (investment banker, collector, philanthropist and patron of the arts)
 Roger Wolfe Kahn (bandleader, composer, nightclub owner, aviator and Otto Hermann Kahn's son)
 Jack Kerouac (writer)
 Willem de Kooning (painter)
 Guy Lombardo (band leader)
 Ashley Massaro
 Costantino Nivola (artist and sculptor)
 Jackson Pollock (painter)
 Mario Puzo (writer)
 Jean Ritchie (dulcimer player)
 Bret Saberhagen (baseball player)
 John Serry, Sr. (musician, composer)
 C. O. Simpkins, Sr. (dentist and civil rights activist)
 Robert Sobel
 John Philip Sousa (composer)
 P. G. Wodehouse (writer)

Connected to Long Island
 Nikola Tesla (inventor, engineer, and futurist)
 The Good Rats (rock band)
 Ultra High Frequency (rock band)

 
Long Island-related lists